Lancaster High School (LHS) is a public high school in Lancaster, Virginia, United States.

Lancaster High School is a 1A school with less than a thousand students

References

External links 
 

Public high schools in Virginia
Education in Lancaster County, Virginia